Richard P. Braun Bridge is a pair of 10-span concrete girder bridges spanning the Mississippi River between Brooklyn Park, Minnesota and Coon Rapids, Minnesota. The eastbound span was built in 1985 to connect Minnesota State Highway 252 with Minnesota State Highway 610 in Coon Rapids. The westbound span was built in 1999 as part of the continued construction of Highway 610 through Brooklyn Park. Richard P. Braun is a former Mn/DOT Commissioner from 1979 to 1986.

There is a walkway on the south side of the bridge that connects a trail along West River Road in Brooklyn Park with a trail along the east side of the river in Coon Rapids. The trail on the east side leads to the Coon Rapids Dam, about a mile and a half north.

See also
List of crossings of the Upper Mississippi River

References
 

Road bridges in Minnesota
Bridges over the Mississippi River
Bridges completed in 1985
Bridges completed in 1999
Concrete bridges in the United States
Girder bridges in the United States
Bridges in Hennepin County, Minnesota
Transportation buildings and structures in Anoka County, Minnesota
1985 establishments in Minnesota